The Samsung Champ was a feature phone that was announced by Samsung in May 2010 GT-C3303K & August 2011 GT-C3303i. It features a quad band GSM support along with a 40 MB internal flash memory (expandable up to 8 GB via microSD), a 2.4-inch, 240x320-pixel resistive touchscreen display, a digital camera and on select models, a 1.3-megapixel camera.

The phone is equipped with a 3.5 mm audio jack, which enables it to be connected with any earphones or speakers of daily use. The phone also comes with dual speakers and a built in voice equalizer.

It was one of the cheapest touchscreen phones available to buy in the market, with prices ranging around $30-$35. Due to its low price and compact size, the phone was very popular with youth.

Full specifications

Platform 
 GSM 850 / 900 / 1800 / 1900
 UI: TouchWiz Lite UI
 WAP 2.0/xHTML, HTML
 Java MIDP v2.0
Only Samsung Champ Duos support WiFi

Size
 Dimensions: 96.2 x 53.8 x 13 mm
 Weight: 80 grams

Display
 2.4 inch TFT LCD resistive touchscreen
 Resolution: 240x320 pixels
 Colours: 256k

Battery
 Li-Ion 1000 mAh
 Up to 12 hours talk-time
 Up to 666 hours standby

Camera
 Digital camera (1,3 megapixel in select models)
 4x digital zoom
 Customizable modes and effects
 Video camera: QCIF (176x144)@15 fps.

Music and sound
 Music player with background play
 MP3/AAC playback.
 Built-in equalizer
 Music library
 3.5 mm audio jack
 Front dual speakers

Entertainment
 Built-In JAVA games
 Stereo FM radio with internal antenna
 30 MB internal memory
 Expandable memory up to 8 GB via MicroSD
 1000 phonebook contacts

References

External links
Samsung Champ on Samsung mobile website
Samsung Champ on Phonearena.com

Champ
Mobile phones introduced in 2010